First degree may refer to:
An undergraduate degree or a first professional degree
First Degree, a drama series
First-degree black belt (martial arts), a proficiency level earned in martial arts
First-degree murder
A first-degree burn
First-degree price discrimination
First-degree atrioventricular block, a disease of the electrical conduction system of the heart
Parent/offspring or sibling (first-degree relative)
A first cousin (third-degree relative)
The First Degree, a 1923 American film directed by Edward Sedgwick starring Frank Mayo

See also
Second degree (disambiguation)
In the 1st Degree, a 1995 interactive legal drama adventure computer game